The Arrangement is an American drama television series created by Jonathan Abrahams which airs on E!. A trailer was released on May 16, 2016. The series premiered on March 5, 2017. On April 13, 2017, E! announced that it had renewed the series for a 10-episode second season, which premiered on March 11, 2018.

On May 29, 2018, the series was canceled after two seasons.

Premise
Megan Morrison, a young actress, auditions to play the female lead in a high-profile film opposite action star Kyle West. She meets Terence Anderson, the leader of the Institute of the Higher Mind, a self-help organization. Anderson offers her the title "arrangement"—a contract offering her $10 million if she marries West.

The show centers around the Hollywood actor and actress's relationship, and is an amalgam' of stories inside Hollywood about arranged relationships against the backdrop of self-help programs". Some reviews suggest it was inspired by Scientology and the relationship between Tom Cruise and Katie Holmes.

Cast and characters

Main

 Christine Evangelista as Megan Morrison West, an unknown actress who, after a successful audition, is plucked from obscurity and offered a secret contract to be the fiancée to Kyle West, one of Hollywood's biggest stars
 Josh Henderson as Kyle West, one of the hottest actors in Hollywood, and the most prominent public face of the Institute of the Higher Mind (IHM)
 Lexa Doig as DeAnn Anderson, Terrence's wife, a successful Hollywood producer, and a high-ranking member of IHM
 Carra Patterson as Shaun, Megan's best friend, who later gets involved with IHM as a lawyer
 Michael Vartan as Terence Anderson, Kyle's producing partner and the leader of the Institute of the Higher Mind

Recurring
 Autumn Reeser as Leslie Bellcamp, Megan's original agent
 Katharine Isabelle as Hope, Megan's old friend
 Ashley Grace as Lisbeth, Kyle's ex-fiancée
 Courtney Paige as Annika (season 1)
 Kyle Toy as Zach, Kyle's personal assistant
 Ruffin Prentiss as Xavier Hughes, a popular musician who Kyle chooses to co-star in his film Technicolor Highway
 Jacob Artist as Wes Blaker, the son of an old friend of DeAnn's who is interested in an acting career (season 2)

Episodes

Series overview
<onlyinclude>

Season 1 (2017)

Season 2 (2018)

References

External links
 
 

2010s American drama television series
2017 American television series debuts
2018 American television series endings
Television shows set in Los Angeles
English-language television shows
Serial drama television series
E! original programming
Television series by All3Media
Television series by Universal Television